Robert Helmer Sims (July 3, 1915 – May 17, 1994) was an American professional basketball player in the United States' National Basketball League. He played for the Buffalo Bisons, Sheboygan Red Skins and Tri-Cities Blackhawks during the 1946–47 season.

References

1915 births
1994 deaths
American men's basketball players
Baltimore Bullets (1944–1954) players
Basketball players from Michigan
Buffalo Bisons (NBL) players
Centers (basketball)
Forwards (basketball)
People from Plainwell, Michigan
Sheboygan Red Skins players
Tri-Cities Blackhawks players
Western Michigan Broncos men's basketball players